Záchlumí is name of several locations in the Czech Republic:

 Záchlumí (Ústí nad Orlicí District), a village in Pardubice Region
 Záchlumí (Tachov District), a village in Plzeň Region